The Ericson 25+, also called the Ericson 25 Mark II, is an American trailerable sailboat that was designed by Bruce King as a cruiser and first built in 1978.

The boat replaced the Ericson 25, often referred to as the Ericson 25 Mark I, in the company product line.

Production
The design was built by Ericson Yachts in the United States, with 660 boats produced between 1978 and 1984, but it is now out of production.

Design
The Ericson 25+ is a recreational keelboat, built predominantly of fiberglass, with wood trim. The hull is solid hand-laid fiberglass, while the deck, cockpit and coach house are balsa-cored fiberglass. It has a fractional sloop rig with a deck-stepped mast. The hull has a raked stem, a nearly plumb transom, an internally mounted spade-type rudder controlled by a tiller and a fixed fin keel or optional shoal draft keel. It displaces  and carries  of lead ballast.

The design has sleeping accommodation for five people, with a double "V"-berth in the bow cabin, two straight settee quarter berths in the main cabin and an aft quarter berth on the starboard side. The galley is located on the port side at the companionway ladder. The galley is "L"-shaped and is equipped with a stove,  icebox and a double sink. The enclosed head is located just aft of the bow cabin on the starboard side.

Operational history
In a 2000 review for Practical Sailor, Darrell Nicholson wrote, "despite the chubbiness of the 25+, owners report that she is a fast boat under sail. There are a number of features that contribute to this speed, She has minimum wetted surface, despite a displacement that is average for her overall length, though fairly light for a waterline length of almost 22' ... Without a doubt, the interior of the Ericson 25+ is a real accomplishment, It is well finished, generally well designed, and remarkably roomy for a boat of this overall length. There is some miniaturization of components, such as the galley sink, head sink, and hanging locker. Nonetheless, she’s a big little boat, and would be truly comfortable for extended coastal cruising for a couple. That is something that can rarely be said for a 25' boat."

In a 2010 review Steve Henkel wrote, "besides changing from a centerboarder to a fin keeler, the Mk II or 25+ version of the Ericson 25 adds a little length and beam, plus five feet of mast height and 23 percent of sail area to the Mk I ... At the same time, displacement is reduced by 400 pounds and ballast is reduced by 500 pounds. No wonder that average PHRF on the Mk II is reduced from 234 on the Mk I to a mere 213. The layout below on the Mk II is roughly the same as on the Mk I, except a starboard-side quarterberth has been added and the galley components have been shifted around a bit ... Best features: Fit and finish are good, as on the Mk I. With her wide beam, tall cabin, and relatively long waterline, the Mk II wins the elbow room prize ... Worst features: As with the Ericson Mk I, we found no significant negative features."

See also
List of sailing boat types

References

External links
Photo of an Ericson 25+

Keelboats
1970s sailboat type designs
Sailing yachts
Trailer sailers
Sailboat type designs by Bruce King
Sailboat types built by Ericson Yachts